Derin Young is an American cultural programmer, producer, songwriter, sound designer, and vocalist.  She was a member of Rodeo Caldonia High Fidelity Performance Theater.

Biography 
Derin Young was raised in New York City. Young has produced content for Black Art In America, Columbus Museum, Crystal Bridges Museum of American Art, Bentonville, AR, De La Cruz Collection, Miami, FL and Institute Contemporary Art (ICA) San Diego, CA among numerous other organizations. Derin was featured as part of the Rodeo Caldonia High Fidelity Performance Theater in the exhibition,  We Wanted A Revolution : Black Radical Women Artists 1950 - 1985 (from 2017 - 2018 — Brooklyn Museum, California African American Museum, ICA Boston).  As a vocalist and songwriter, Young has worked alongside such artists as Baba Olatunji, Lenny Kravitz with Vanessa Paradis, Living Colour, M.C. Solaar and many more.  In 2021, Young was acknowledged for best sound design by WT FRINGE Women's Theatre Festival for the play "Life Before Reconstruction" by Alva Rogers. Derin currently produces and hosts an arts and education Podcast called the audioPERKULATOR®.

Career 
Derin has performed throughout North America, Europe, Indian Ocean, and Japan. Some of her collaborative performance credits include: MC Solaar (Polydor/Polygram, France), Vanessa Paradis (Live (Vanessa Paradis album) on Remark/Polygram, France, produced by Lenny Kravitz) and Living Colour ("Time's Up", Epic Records).

References

External links 
 The Audio Perkulator https://audioperkulator.com/
 audioPERK on American Art, Aesthetics and Experience with Dr. Leo Twiggs and Dr. Frank Martin https://www.youtube.com/watch?v=gqoNe5MjmHE

Living people
American women singer-songwriters
People from New York City
Year of birth missing (living people)
21st-century American women
Singer-songwriters from New York (state)